Amarasimendrapuram  is a village in the Aranthangirevenue block of Pudukkottai district, Tamil Nadu, India.

Demographics 

As per the 2001 census, Amarasimendrapuram had a total population of 
2085 with 1011 males and 1074 females. Out of the total population 1190 people were literate.

References

Villages in Pudukkottai district